Teenage Heart may refer to:

Teenage Heart, 1980 album by The Meteors (Dutch band)
"Teenage Heart", song by Barclay James Harvest Ring of Changes  1983
"Teenage Heart", song by Cock Sparrer on Shock Troops (album)
"Teenage Heart", song by Lady Antebellum Heart Break (Lady Antebellum album) 2017
"My Teenage Heart", Bay City Rollers (album)